Badiabad (also Romanized as Badī‘ābād; also known as Amīrābad, Amīrābād Gūsheh, and Amir Abad Olya) is a village in Gamasiyab Rural District, in the Central District of Nahavand County, Hamadan Province, Iran. At the 2006 census, its population was 108, in 33 families.

References 

Populated places in Nahavand County